Jodi White  is a Canadian philanthropist and political operative who served as Chief of Staff to the Prime Minister under Kim Campbell in 1993.

Career 
White's career began as a television news reporter and as a radio producer. White once held the post of President of the Public Policy Forum, an independent, national, non-profit organization with a mandate to promote better public policy and better public management through dialogue among leaders from the public, private, labour and voluntary sectors. She was the Vice President of corporate affairs at Imasco Ltd., the founder of Sydney House and co-founder of Neville Group.

White is the first woman in Canadian history to lead a national election campaign. She directed the 1997 national election campaign of then Progressive Conservative Party of Canada leader Jean Charest. White also sits on the board of directors for the Canadian International Council.

She was awarded the Queen Elizabeth II Diamond Jubilee Medal in 2012. On December 13, 2013, White was invested as a Member of the Order of Canada for her role in "promoting civic dialogue in Canada [and]... social and environmental philanthropy".

She sits on the board Tides Canada, the National Theatre School, the Canadian Institute of International Affairs, the Southern Africa Education Trust Fund, Bishop's University, and Ottawa General Hospital.

Personal life 
White holds a Bachelor of Arts in political science from the University of Toronto and a Bachelor of Arts (Honours) in journalism from Carleton University. While there, she joined the sorority Alpha Phi.

References

Canadian journalists
Carleton University alumni
Living people
University of Toronto alumni
Year of birth missing (living people)
Chiefs of staff of the Canadian Prime Minister's Office
Canadian women in federal politics
Canadian campaign managers
Members of the Order of Canada